The Westmoreland County Transit Authority (WCTA) is the operator of mass transportation in Westmoreland County, Pennsylvania. Using 35 buses, a total of 18 routes are operated, the majority of which serve the urbanized corridor that makes up the western portion of the county. Bus routes in this area are designed to provide access for suburban commuters to Downtown Pittsburgh, as well as transportation for both workers and shoppers to the large suburbs of Greensburg and New Kensington, Pennsylvania the most prominent entities in the county's boundaries. Rural eastern bus routes allow for commutes to Greensburg and also provide service to the city of Johnstown in neighboring Cambria County.

The service was operated by Forsythe Transportation until July 2012 when acquired by National Express Transit.

Suburban Pittsburgh Routes

Weekday Routes

Flyer Routes
 1F Greensburg-Pittsburgh Flyer: Greensburg, Hempfield, Irwin, North Huntingdon to Downtown Pittsburgh via Route 30
 1F Sheetz Park-and-Ride/Hempfield Pointe: Limited stop service to Downtown Pittsburgh via Route 30
2F Latrobe-Pittsburgh Flyer: Latrobe, Greensburg, Delmont, Export, Murrysville to Downtown Pittsburgh
 2F Pittsburgh-Delmont Flyer: Delmont and Murrysville to Downtown Pittsburgh
3F Mount Pleasant-Pittsburgh Flyer: Mount Pleasant, New Stanton Park and Ride, Irwin, North Huntington, Downtown Pittsburgh
14F New Kensington-Pittsburgh Flyer: Vandergrift, Lower Burrell, New Kensington to Downtown Pittsburgh

Local Routes
All routes operate Monday thru Friday. Routes marked with an asterisk (*) indicate the route operates on Saturdays.

4 Pittsburgh: Pittsburgh via Route 30 and Oakland*
5 Jeannette: Jeannette via Greengate Center (Wal-Mart) Hempfield Square (Giant Eagle), Sam's Club and Route 30 West*
6 Irwin: Irwin and Hermine via Route 130, Jeannette, Manor, Westmoreland City, Arona Road and Rilton
8 Youngwood/New Stanton/Mt. Pleasant: South Greensburg, Youngwood, Westmoreland County Community College, New Stanton, Mount Pleasant Wal-Mart* (Saturday service does not serve WCCC)
9 Latrobe-Derry: Westmoreland Mall, Latrobe, Loyalhanna, Derry with limited service to Ligonier*
11 Johnstown - Johnstown via Westmoreland Mall (peak-periods only), Latrobe, Ligonier, New Florence and Seward.
12 Greensburg-New Kensington: New Kensington via Delmont and Murrysville
12C Autumn Brook-Westmoreland Mall: Express Bus to Westmoreland Mall
14 New Kensington Local: New Kensington, Arnold, Lower Burrell*
14J New Kensington-Pittsburgh Mills: New Kensington, Penn State New Kensington , Pittsburgh Mills Wal-Mart*
15 Avonmore-New Kensington: Avonmore, Vandergrift
16 Greensburg-Mt. Pleasant via UPG: Greensburg and University of Pittsburgh at Greensburg to Norvelt, Mount Pleasant
17 Mt. Pleasant-Scottdale*

Park & Ride Lots
Arnold Palmer Regional Airport (Unity Township) - 100 spaces (Route 2F)
Five Star Trail (Hempfield Township) - 28 spaces (Routes 1F, 2F, 4, 9, 12 (PM Express Only), and 20F)
Westmoreland Crossing (Hempfield Township) - 45 spaces (Routes 1F, 4, 8)
Carpenter Lane (North Huntingdon Township) - 250 spaces (Routes 1F, 3F, & 4)
New Stanton - (New Stanton) - 30 spaces (Routes 3F and 8)
Countryside Plaza - (Mount Pleasant) - 40 spaces (Routes 3F, 16, 17, and FACT)
Trinity United Church of Christ (Delmont) - 20 spaces (Routes 2F and 12)
Living Waters Worship Center (Irwin) - 70 spaces (Routes 1F, 4, and 6)
Allegheny Plaza (Vandergrift) - (Routes 14F and 15)
Hillcrest Plaza (Lower Burrell) - (Routes 14, 14F, and 15)

Fleet
13 MCI D4000 (Diesel)
6 MCI D4500 (Diesel)
6 MCI D4500 (CNG)
5 Gillig 35-foot CNG Buses
1 Gillig 30-foot Diesel Bus
 11 Ford F550 CNG Buses

References

External links
westmorelandtransit.com

Bus transportation in Pennsylvania
National Express companies
Transportation in Pittsburgh
Transportation in Westmoreland County, Pennsylvania
1978 establishments in Pennsylvania